Aïssa Boudechicha (born 13 April 2000) is an Algerian professional footballer who plays as a left-back for Championnat National 3 side Bordeaux B.

Club career 
Boudechicha started his career with his hometown club OBM Medjana before joining CA Bordj Bou Arreridj, where he spent seven years. On August 30, 2019, Boudechicha signed a four-year contract with French club Bordeaux.

References

External links
 

2000 births
Algeria under-23 international footballers
Algeria youth international footballers
Algerian expatriate footballers
Algerian expatriate sportspeople in France
Algerian footballers
Algerian Ligue Professionnelle 1 players
CA Bordj Bou Arréridj players
ES Sétif players
Expatriate footballers in France
FC Girondins de Bordeaux players
Living people
People from Bordj Bou Arréridj Province
Association football fullbacks
21st-century Algerian people